Mroczki Małe is a village in the administrative district of Gmina Błaszki, within Sieradz County, Łódź Voivodeship, in central Poland.

The village has a population of 170.

References

Villages in Sieradz County